Aleksandra Markovska (born 4 May 1997) is a Macedonian footballer who plays as a midfielder for the North Macedonia national team.

International career
Markovska made her debut for the North Macedonia national team on 26 October 2013, coming on as a substitute for Martina Dimoska against the Czech Republic.

References

1997 births
Living people
Women's association football midfielders
Macedonian women's footballers
North Macedonia women's international footballers